This is page shows results of Canadian federal elections in the province of Manitoba outside the Winnipeg area.

Regional profile
Rural Manitoba is, for the most part, a strongly conservative area (especially on social issues), though it becomes far less strident the further one gets from the U.S. border. The rural portions of southern Manitoba are similar to the rural portions of the Central United States, as well as rural portions of Saskatchewan and Alberta. Not only are they heavily agricultural, but they are some of the most religious areas in Canada. The Conservatives hold all five rural ridings in the south, with their largest margins of victory in the three ridings on the U.S. border. The Liberals swept the region in 1993, and managed to hold on to two ridings here in 1997. However, they have barely been on the radar screen since the turn of the millennium.

Northern Manitoba is home to only one riding: Churchill—Keewatinook Aski (formerly Churchill, from 1935 until 2015), which has been in NDP hands for all but six years since 1979. Former NDP MP Bev Desjarlais lost the nomination to Niki Ashton in 2006 and ran unsuccessfully as an independent; the Liberals were able to pick up Churchill with star candidate Tina Keeper. Ashton reclaimed Churchill for the NDP in the next election in 2008, however, and has continued to represent it since then.

2021 - 44th General Election 

|-
| style="background-color:whitesmoke" |Brandon—Souris
|
|Linda Branconnier4,60812.08%
||
|Larry Maguire22,73359.57%
|
|Whitney Hodgins7,83820.54%
|
|
|
|Tylor Baer2,9817.81%
|
|
||
|Larry Maguire
|-
| style="background-color:whitesmoke" |Churchill—Keewatinook Aski
|
|Shirley Robinson4,51425.18%
|
|Charlotte Larocque4,33024.15%
||
|Niki Ashton7,63242.57%
|
|Ralph McLean5523.08%
|
|Dylan Young8995.01%
|
|
||
|Niki Ashton
|-
| style="background-color:whitesmoke" |Dauphin—Swan River—Neepawa
|
|Kevin Carlson4,89212.70%
||
|Dan Mazier22,71858.99%
|
|Arthur Holroyd5,67814.74%
|
|Shirley Lambrecht8352.17%
|
|Donnan McKenna4,05210.52%
|
|Lori Falloon-Austin (Mav.)3390.88%
||
|Dan Mazier
|-
| style="background-color:whitesmoke" |Portage—Lisgar
|
|Andrew Carrier4,96710.95%
||
|Candice Bergen23,81952.52%
|
|Ken Friesen6,06813.38%
|
|
|
|Solomon Wiebe9,79021.58%
|
|Jerome Dondo (CHP)7121.57%
||
|Candice Bergen
|-
| style="background-color:whitesmoke" |Provencher
|
|Trevor Kirczenow8,47116.98%
||
|Ted Falk24,29448.68%
|
|Serina Pottinger6,27012.56%
|
|Janine G. Gibson1,2732.55%
|
|Nöel Gautron8,22716.49%
|
|Rick Loewen (Ind.)1,3662.74%
||
|Ted Falk
|-
| style="background-color:whitesmoke" |Selkirk—Interlake—Eastman
|
|Detlev Regelsky6,56713.24%
||
|James Bezan28,30857.06%
|
|Margaret Smith9,60419.36%
|
|Wayne James1,3282.68%
|
|Ian Kathwaroon3,8007.66%
|
|
||
|James Bezan
|}

2019 - 43rd General Election 

|-
|rowspan=2 style="background-color:whitesmoke" |Brandon—Souris
|rowspan=2 |
|rowspan=2 |Terry Hayward4,97212.07%
|rowspan=2 |
|rowspan=2 |Larry Maguire26,14863.46%
|rowspan=2 |
|rowspan=2 |Ashley Duguay5,80514.09%
|rowspan=2 |
|rowspan=2 |Bill Tiessen2,9847.24%
|rowspan=2 |
|rowspan=2 |Robin Lussier6911.68%
|rowspan=2 |
|rowspan=2 |Rebecca Hein2800.68%
|
|Robert Eastcott 107 0.26%
|rowspan=2 |
|rowspan=2 |Larry Maguire
|-
|
|Vanessa Hamilton 219 0.53%
|-
| style="background-color:whitesmoke" |Churchill—Keewatinook Aski
|
|Judy Klassen5,61623.71%
|
|Cyara Bird4,71419.90%
||
|Niki Ashton11,91950.32%
|
|Ralph McLean1,1444.83%
|
|Ken Klyne2941.24%
|
|
|
|
||
|Niki Ashton
|-
| style="background-color:whitesmoke" |Dauphin—Swan River—Neepawa
|
|Cathy Scofield-Singh5,34413.17%
||
|Dan Mazier26,10364.35%
|
|Laverne Lewycky5,72414.11%
|
|Kate Storey2,2145.46%
|
|Frank Godon7111.75%
|
|Jenni Johnson4701.16%
|
|
||
|Robert Sopuck†
|-
| style="background-color:whitesmoke" |Portage—Lisgar
|
|Ken Werbiski4,77910.71%
||
|Candice Bergen31,60070.79%
|
|Cindy Friesen3,8728.67%
|
|Beverley Eert2,3565.28%
|
|Aaron Archer1,1692.62%
|
|Jerome Dondo8601.93%
|
|
||
|Candice Bergen
|-
| style="background-color:whitesmoke" |Provencher
|
|Trevor Kirczenow6,34713.14%
||
|Ted Falk31,82165.88%
|
|Erin McGee6,18712.81%
|
|Janine G. Gibson2,8845.97%
|
|Wayne Sturby1,0662.21%
|
|
|
|
||
|Ted Falk
|-
| style="background-color:whitesmoke" |Selkirk—Interlake—Eastman
|
|Detlev Regelsky6,00312.10%
||
|James Bezan31,10962.72%
|
|Robert A. Smith8,87317.89%
|
|Wayne James2,9345.92%
|
|Ian Kathwaroon6831.38%
|
|
|
|
||
|James Bezan
|}<noinclude>

2015 - 42nd General Election

2011 - 41st General Election

2008 - 40th General Election

2006 - 39th General Election

2004 - 38th General Election

Brandon-Souris
Churchill
Dauphin-Swan River-Marquette
Portage-Lisgar
Provencher
Selkirk-Interlake

References

Canadian federal election results in Manitoba